KCYE (107.9 FM, "107.9 Coyote Country") is a radio station licensed to Meadview, Arizona. Owned by Beasley Broadcast Group, it broadcasts a Country format serving Clark County, Nevada (including the Las Vegas metropolitan area).

The station's studios are located in the unincorporated Clark County area of Spring Valley, while its transmitter is southwest of Lake Mead in Arizona. A fill-in transmitter atop The Strat provides additional coverage in Las Vegas proper.

History

Rhythmic (2002-2005) 
Under former ownership of the locally based Desert Sky Media (which also owned KOAS, then a smooth jazz station), the station was V-108, launched in 2002 at first as a Rhythmic Top 40 formatted station. Months later, due to a fierce competition with heritage KLUC and the newly launched KVEG, it shifted to an Urban Adult Contemporary format and carried the Tom Joyner Morning Show and the Michael Baisden show. It was moderately successful but it only lasted for three years.

Alternative (2005-2011) 
Riviera Broadcast Group acquired both KVGS and KOAS from Desert Sky, and flipped KVGS on October 21, 2005, to an alternative-based radio station (with a slight lean towards adult album alternative) as Area 108 (Area 107-9 as of October 2007). In September 2009, it re-branded again as 107-9 The Alternative.

Adult hits (2011-2015) 
On October 20, 2011, soon after Beasley Broadcast Group bought the station and KOAS, KVGS ended its alternative rock format and flipped to adult hits as 107.9 Bob-FM. This returned the format to Las Vegas since KKJJ flipped from Jack FM to a simulcast of KXNT as KXNT-FM.

Hot adult contemporary (2015-2022) 
On January 12, 2015, at 3 p.m., after a skit depicting Bob "selling" the station (and "selling" its library of 1980s music to sister station KKLZ) because he was leaving Las Vegas, the station flipped to hot adult contemporary as Star 107.9. The new format competes primarily with the market leading KMXB. In July, the station subsequently picked up former KMXB morning host Mark DiCiero, but he left the station in March 2016. KVGS then picked up the syndicated Brooke & Jubal from KQMV in Seattle in July 2016.

Country (2022-present) 
On June 17, 2022, it was announced that KVGS and KCYE would swap formats and call signs at 10 a.m. on June 24, with KVGS' hot adult contemporary format being relaunched as "102.7 VGS", and KCYE's country music format, branded "Coyote Country", moving to 107.9.

Boosters
KCYE operates an on-channel FM booster, KCYE-FM1, which is located on the top of The Strat's tower. It provides fill-in coverage for the immediate Las Vegas area.

Gallery

References

External links
Official Website

CYE
Radio stations established in 1992
1992 establishments in Arizona
CYE
Country radio stations in the United States